Charles Schneider may refer to:

Charles Conrad Schneider (1843–1916), civil engineer and bridge designer
Charles Sumner Schneider (1874–1932), architect
Charles Schneider (politician) (born 1973), member of the Iowa Senate
Charles Schneider (businessman) (1898–1960), French businessman

See also
Charles W. Schneider House